Anne P. Mitchell (born April 3, 1958) is an attorney, Professor of Law, and the founder and CEO of the Institute for Social Internet Public Policy.

Biography
In 1988, Mitchell founded an early fathers' rights group in Buffalo, New York, while she was studying pre-law at SUNY Buffalo. Upon moving to California to attend Stanford Law School she founded the first fathers' rights BBS which she ran from her student housing.

After graduating from Stanford, Mitchell opened a fathers' rights law practice, through which she represented fathers wishing to remain involved in the lives of their children following divorce. She spoke publicly and privately on the issues of fathers' rights and the need for children to have their fathers involved in their lives. Mitchell spoke, by invitation, to the California judges' bench Beyond the Bench program, to Santa Clara Family Court Services, and at Governor Pete Wilson's "Focus on Fathers summit.

Television show
In 1997, Mitchell produced and was the host of the cable show "Fathers are Parents Too". The half-hour television talk show "focused on the concerns, issues, and realities related to becoming and staying an involved father." Thirty-six episodes of "Fathers are Parents Too" were filmed in 1997, and were shown on cable television stations throughout the United States.

Anti-spam and Internet law
In 1998, Mitchell closed her fathers' rights practice, and changed her focus to Internet law and anti-spam efforts. She joined Mail Abuse Prevention System (MAPS), the first formal anti-spam organization, as Director of Legal and Public Affairs. While at MAPS Mitchell led the strategy for the first anti-spam lawsuits.

In 2002 Mitchell stepped in as CEO and co-founder of the newly created Habeas. A year later Mitchell left Habeas to found and run the Institute for Spam and Internet Public Policy (ISIPP),

During her tenure at Habeas, Mitchell coined the term "deliverability" and founded and led the first Email Deliverability Summits, which became the impetus for founding ISIPP when she left Habeas.

Philanthropy
In September 2005, Mitchell founded Auction Aid to help the victims of Hurricane Katrina, enlisting donated items from friends and colleagues Guy Kawasaki, Béla Fleck, Warren Farrell, Anne Fadiman, Eduardo Sánchez and Sir Harold Evans, to raise more than $5,000.  Originally Auction Aid was created using eBay's "Giving Works" platform, about which Mitchell later criticized.

Selected works
Mitchell has published many papers and authored one ebook.

References

External links

 Institute for Social Internet Public Policy
 DadsRights.org
 Habeas
 Auction Aid
 Dushanbe Relief Fund

1958 births
Living people
American women chief executives
Fathers' rights activists
Anti-spam
American women lawyers
21st-century American women